Segbefia is a surname. Notable people with the surname include:

Alex Segbefia (born 1963), Ghanaian lawyer and politician
Alikem Segbefia (born 1990), Togolese footballer
Fredrick Percival Segbefia (born 1931),  Ghanaian politician
Prince Segbefia (born 1991), Togolese professional footballer